The Mantra of Light, also called the Mantra of the Unfailing Rope Snare, is an important mantra of the Shingon and Kegon sects of Buddhism, but is not emphasized in other Vajrayana sects of Buddhism. It is taken from the Amoghapāśa-kalparāja-sūtra (Chinese translation Taisho ed. no. 1092) or Sutra of the Mantra of the Unfailing Rope Snare of the Buddha Vairocana's Great Baptism and is associated with the deity Amoghapāśa (Unfailing Rope), a form of Avalokiteshvara.  

The mantra is the following:

 Sanskrit
Roman Script: Oṃ Amogha Vairocana Mahāmudrā Maṇipadma Jvalapravartāya Hūṃ
Devanagari: ॐ अमोघ वैरोचन महामुद्रा मणिपद्म ज्वल प्रवर्ताय हूँ 
Siddhaṃ: 

Japanese: おん あぼきゃ べいろしゃのう まかぼだら まに はんどま じんばら はらばりたや うん Om abogya beiroshanō makabodara mani handoma jinbara harabari tayaun
Korean: 옴 아모가 바이로차나 마하무드라  마니 파드마 즈바라 프라바릍타야 훔 om amoga bairochana mahamudeura mani padeuma jeubara peurabareutaya hum
Vietnamese: Án (Ông/Úm) A ma cát Hoài lô giai nã Ma cáp mẫu đức la Ma ni bá đức ma Cập phạp la Bát la phạp nhĩ đả nha Hồng
Kanji and Chinese script: 唵 阿謨伽 尾盧左曩 摩訶母捺囉 麽抳 鉢納麽 入嚩攞 鉢囉韈哆野 吽 Ǎn ā mó jiā wěi lú zuǒ nǎng mó hē mǔ nà luō me nǐ bō nà me rù mó luó bō luō wà duō yě hōng
Tibetan: ཨོཾ་ཨ་མོ་གྷ་བཻ་རོ་ཙ་ན་མ་ཧཱ་མུ་དྲཱ་མ་ཎི་པདྨ​་ཛྭ་ལ་པྲ་ཝརྟཱ་ཡ་ཧཱུྃ

The translation of this mantra, according to Professor Mark Unno, is roughly:

Another translation according to the Dharmachakra Translation Committee is: “Oṁ, amogha jewel-lotus of the splendorous great mudrā! Blaze! Set in motion! Hūṁ!”Initially, the mantra received little mention in East Asian Buddhist texts, and although Kukai brought the sutra to Japan in the 9th century, there are no records that he ever utilized it in tantric practices. Records show gradually increasing use in the Heian Period, until the 13th century when it was popularized in medieval Japanese Buddhism by Myōe, and later by Shingon monks Eison and Ninshō in their ministries. Both the Mantra and the nembutsu were often incorporated by medieval Buddhists at one time or another, often in the same service. A common practice for the Mantra of Light was to sprinkle pure sand, blessed with this mantra, on the body of a deceased person or their tomb, based on teachings expounded in the Sutra. The belief was that a person who had accumulated much bad karma, and possible rebirth in Hell would be immediately freed and allowed a favorable rebirth into the Pure Land of Amitabha Buddha.

References

Shingon Buddhism
Buddhist mantras
Vairocana Buddha